Euriphene obsoleta is a butterfly in the family Nymphalidae. It is found in Cameroon, the Democratic Republic of the Congo, Uganda and Tanzania. The habitat consists of forests.

The larvae possibly feed on Combretum species.

Subspecies
Euriphene obsoleta obsoleta (Cameroon, Uganda, Democratic Republic of the Congo: Uele, Kivu)
Euriphene obsoleta munene Hecq, 1994 (north-western Tanzania)

References

Butterflies described in 1908
Taxa named by Karl Grünberg
Euriphene